Starfire is a role-playing game published in 1989 by Starfire.

Contents
Starfire is a game in which the player characters are members of the Starfire freedom fighting organization dedicated to freeing mankind from the insectoid Nytharkans.

Reception
Steve G Jones reviewed Starfire for Games International magazine, and gave it a rating of 4 out of 10, and stated that "Overall, Starfire fails to make any great strides in science fiction rolegame design, but it is much cheaper than the competition."

References

Science fiction role-playing games